The Imp of the Perverse is a metaphor for the urge to do exactly the wrong thing in a given situation for the sole reason that it is possible for wrong to be done.  The impulse is compared to an imp (a small demon) which leads an otherwise decent person into mischief, and occasionally to their death.

Poe's short stories
The phrase has a long history in literature, and was popularized (and perhaps coined) by Edgar Allan Poe in his short story, "The Imp of the Perverse".

Poe explores this impulse through several of his fictional characters, such as the narrators in "The Black Cat" and in "The Tell-Tale Heart", and includes hints of it in multiple other tales of his.

Other usages
 The Imp of the Perverse is also exemplified in "Le Mauvais Vitrier" ("The Bad Glazier"), a prose poem by Charles Baudelaire.
 The concept also figures prominently in the motives of Jack Shaftoe, a swashbuckling protagonist in Neal Stephenson's trilogy The Baroque Cycle:

 Eric Berne saw what he called the "demon" in the self as the (vocalisation of) a primitive id impulse, citing the instance of a stockbroker who at the key moment "heard a demonic whisper telling him: 'Don't sell, buy'. He abandoned his carefully planned campaign, and lost his entire capital – 'Ha, ha,' he said".

See also

Aubrey Beardsley
Death drive
Destrudo

Curiosity
Intrusive thought
L'appel du vide
Obsessive-compulsive disorder
Oppositional defiant disorder
Shoulder angel
Tourette syndrome

References

External links
 "The Imp of the Perverse" by Edgar Allan Poe

Problem behavior
Concepts in ethics
Literary concepts
Metaphors